The mountain chub (Algansea monticola) is a species of freshwater fish in the family Cyprinidae, endemic to the Huaynamota (part of the Grande de Santiago River basin), Juchipila (upper Lerma River basin) and Bolaños rivers (forming a link between Huaynamota and Juchipila) in west-central Mexico.

References

Algansea
Fish described in 1968
Freshwater fish of Mexico
Endemic fish of Mexico
Río Grande de Santiago